The Jersey Express is a team in the American Basketball Association based in Paterson, New Jersey. The team was formed in 2005 as the Newark Express. Marsha Blount is the owner of the team.

Inaugural season (2005–06)
The Express ended the regular season on March 5, 2006, after losing an away game to the Buffalo Rapids. Their record for the regular season was 14-16 and they finished third in the Roger Brown Division behind the Harlem Strong Dogs and the Strong Island Sound. They had a bye week for the first round of the playoffs. They played on March 17, 2006, in Atlanta against their second round opponent, the Atlanta Vision.

The Express started the season with star players Aswan Morris, Rasheed Sparks, Jamie Sowers and Derek Washington and Marcus Toney-El from the Jersey SkyCats. The head coach of the team in their first season was Darryl Dawkins. Former Newark Mayor, Sharpe James, and the city council gave money to the team and became an official sponsor during their inaugural season.

The Newark Express had a small number (100-250 fans on average) at their games, but there was more loyalty and noise among the fans toward the end of the season. The team had mentioned the possibility of moving to a larger arena in the future. Although the Prudential Center was completed in 2007, the low attendance prevented the team from using the arena.

The Newark Express season ended with a loss against the top ranked Rochester Razorsharks 126-98 on March 19, 2006 in the second round of the playoffs. The Razorsharks went on to win the 2005-2006 ABA Championship.

Second season (2006–07)
The Express hired Ron Moore, a Brooklyn native and former New York Knick to serve as head coach beginning in November 2006. At the end of November 2006, Ron Moore resigned from the Express and was replaced by co-owner Marsha Blount, who will serve as interim head coach.

Jersey Express (2017–18)
The team announced they have relocated to Paterson, New Jersey

Notable players

David Abidor (born 1992), soccer player

References

External links
Jersey Express official website
US Basketball

American Basketball Association (2000–present) teams
Basketball in Newark, New Jersey
Basketball teams in New Jersey
Basketball teams established in 2005
2005 establishments in New Jersey
Sports in Paterson, New Jersey